Rachata Moraksa (born February 21, 2000) is a Thai professional footballer who plays as an midfielder.

References

External links
 at Soccerway

2000 births
Living people
Rachata Moraksa
Rachata Moraksa
Association football midfielders
Rachata Moraksa
Rachata Moraksa
Rachata Moraksa